The Central East African lampeye (Lacustricola centralis) is a species of fish in the family Poeciliidae. It is found in Tanzania and Uganda. Its natural habitats are swamps, freshwater lakes, freshwater marshes, intermittent freshwater marshes, and inland deltas. It is threatened by habitat loss.

References

Aplocheilichthys
Fish described in 1996
Taxa named by Lothar Seegers
Taxonomy articles created by Polbot
Taxobox binomials not recognized by IUCN